Joanne Louise Atkinson (born 4 March 1959), also known by her married name Joanne Palmer, is an English former competitive swimmer.

Swimming career
Atkinson represented Great Britain at the 1976 Summer Olympics in Montreal, Quebec, where she competed in the preliminary heats of the women's 100- and 200-metre butterfly events.

Atkinson was born in Chipping Campden, Gloucestershire, England, and she attended Millfield School in Somerset.  At Millfield, Atkinson was trained by swimming coach Paddy Garratt.

As a 15-year-old, she represented England at the 1974 British Commonwealth Games in Christchurch, New Zealand, where she reached the finals of the women's 100-metre butterfly and 4×100-metre medley relay events. At the ASA National British Championships she won the 100 metres butterfly title in 1973 and 1975  and the 200 metres butterfly title in 1975.

After Millfield, Atkinson attended the University of Miami in Miami, Florida, where she competed for the Miami Hurricanes swimming and diving team in 1977 and 1978.  She received All-American honours both years.  She later attended the universities of Durham and Loughborough.  She is married (married surname Palmer) and has two children.

See also
Great Britain at the 1976 Summer Olympics

References

1959 births
Living people
English female swimmers
Miami Hurricanes women's swimmers
Olympic swimmers of Great Britain
People educated at Millfield
People from Chipping Campden
Swimmers at the 1976 Summer Olympics
Swimmers at the 1974 British Commonwealth Games
Sportspeople from Gloucestershire
Commonwealth Games competitors for England
20th-century English women
21st-century English women